M. Indira served as the Member of the Legislative Assembly for Shadnagar constituency in Andhra Pradesh, India, between 1985 and 1989. They represented the Telugu Desam Party.

References

Andhra Pradesh MLAs 1985–1989
Telugu Desam Party politicians
Telugu politicians
Year of birth missing
Possibly living people